An impala is an African antelope.

Impala or IMPALA may also refer to:

Arts

Music
Impala (album), an album by Songs: Ohia
The Impalas, an American 1950s doo-wop group
Independent Music Companies Association, European trade association for independent record labels, known as IMPALA
Tame Impala, an Australian band
The Jewels, formerly the Impalas, a girl group

Media
Impala (DC Comics), a superhero in the DC Comics universe
Impala (Marvel Comics), a supervillain in the Marvel Comics universe

Sport
Impala Saracens, a Kenyan rugby club based in Nairobi, Kenya
Impalas (cricket team), a cricket team representing minor South African provinces

Other
Apache Impala, a modern SQL query engine for Apache Hadoop
Chevrolet Impala, an automobile produced by General Motors
Impala SAS, a French company
1320 Impala, an asteroid

See also
Impaler (disambiguation)